Falco Kosárlabda Club, for sponsorship reasons named Falco Volvo Alpok Autó Szombathely, is a Hungarian professional basketball club based in Szombathely. The team play their home games at Arena Savaria, a multi-use complex, which was opened in 2006.

History

Beginning and uprising
The club was created in 1980, when basketball fanatics György Gráczer and István Németh with the support of the local wood industry Falco started to organize meetings and trainings. In that year the club entered the county level championship. In 1987, Falco decided to invest more money into the club and the success was immediate. By winning the championship in the 1987/88 season they won promotion to the second division. In the next year they did surprisingly well, finishing on the top in the regular season with only two losses, but failed in the play-offs final. A season later there was nothing what could prevent the yellow-blacks to lift the trophy in the final, and with that, after 27 years Szombathely got a top-flight basketball team again.

Successful years
The goal in the inaugural season couldn't be more than to stay in the NBI, which they clearly managed. In the following years Falco turned into a good mid-table team with a good reputation. In the 1995/96 and 1996/97 season Falco have been only a step away from the semifinals, fallen in decisive fifth match. In the next year the team finished only 7th in the league but won silver medal in the Hungarian National Basketball Cup. The team reached its top performance next year, finishing second in the National Championship and beating teams like Rimini and Beşiktaş in the Korać Cup.

Financial crisis and revival

In the next few years Falco continued with high-level results, but a slow decreasing had been noticed. For 2002 the team went into a financial crisis, and produced the worst final place of the past years. A long-term, step by step financial consolidation plan have been accepted in that year, which saved the club from bankruptcy, but prevented the club to make quality signings. Still, the team had won a valuable bronze medal in the Hungarian Cup. After the financials have been cleared a quick improvement have started. In 2006 Falco moved to the newly built Arena Savaria and Srećko Sekulović arrived to coach the guys. In his first year in charge, after beating the reigning champion Atomerőmű, the team finished fourth in the playoff. In the 2007/2008 season Falco played unstoppable, the hard-work of Sekulović fructified and won the Championship title, first time in the club's history by beating arch-rival Körmend 3–1. In the Cup they marched till the final, where they lost to Atomerőmű in an epic battle. Nowadays Falco considered one of the top clubs in the country in  a highly competitive league and have one of the best youth base in the country.

In 2015, Falco played in the 2015–16 FIBA Europe Cup, the third-tier continental level. Finishing with a 2–4 record in Group C, Falco was eliminated in the regular season.

In the following 2016–17 season, Falco had a successful year in the NB I/A. The club reached the playoff finals for the first time, where its lost 3–2 to Alba Fehérvár.

In the 2017–18 FIBA Europe Cup season, Falco played better as it had a 3–3 record but the club did not advance past the regular season.

In the 2018–19 season, Falco won its second national championship completing a total sweep in the playoffs. In the quarter-finals they eliminated KTE. Then they made it to the finals with sweeping Szolnoki Olaj KK. In the finals they upset their local rival BC Körmend 3–0, celebrating the Championship Title away.

In the 2019–20 season, Falco managed to qualify for the Basketball Champions League (BCL). Since the league was cut short due to the COVID-19 pandemic, Falco gained the rights to join again for the 2020–21 season.

Players

Current roster

Retired numbers

Other notable players
To appear in this section a player must have either:
- Set a club record or won an individual award as a professional player.
- Played at least one official international match for his senior national team.
  Benedek Váradi
  Antonio Alexe

Honours

Domestic competitions
Nemzeti Bajnokság I/A (National Championship of Hungary)
 Champions (4): 2007–08, 2018–19, 2020–21, 2021-22
 Runners-up (4): 1998–99, 2011–12, 2016–17, 2017–18
 Third place (2): 1999–00, 2001–02

Magyar Kupa (National Cup of Hungary) 
 Champions (1): 2021
 Runners-up (6): 1998, 2008, 2009, 2010, 2018, 2019

Season by season

 Cancelled due to the COVID-19 pandemic in Hungary.

In European competition
Source: basketball.eurobasket.com
Participations in Champions League: 2x
Participations in FIBA Europe Cup: 3x
Participations in Korać Cup: 2x

References 
The history of Falco (Hungarian)

External links
Official Team Page 

Basketball teams established in 1980
Basketball teams in Hungary
Sport in Szombathely